The 2014 Grand Prix Hassan II doubles was a professional tennis tournament played on clay courts in Casablanca, Morocco.

Julian Knowle and Filip Polášek were the defending champions, but Polášek chose not to participate. Knowle plays alongside Christopher Kas, but they lost in the first round to Tomasz Bednarek and Lukáš Dlouhý.
Jean-Julien Rojer and Horia Tecău won the title, defeating Bednarek and Dlouhý in the final, 6–2, 6–2.

Seeds

  Jean-Julien Rojer /  Horia Tecău (champions)
  Jamie Murray /  John Peers (semifinals)
  Colin Fleming /  Jonathan Marray (quarterfinals)
  Oliver Marach /  Florin Mergea (quarterfinals)

Draw

Draw

References
Main Draw

Doubles